Anne Kirkpatrick (born 1959) is an American law enforcement officer, the former Chief of the Spokane Police Department and the first woman to head the Oakland Police Department.

Early life and education
Kirkpatrick is from Memphis, Tennessee, where she graduated in 1977 from Hutchison School and earned a master's degree in counseling psychology from the University of Memphis; she later studied at Seattle University School of Law.

Career
Kirkpatrick began her career in law enforcement with the Memphis Police Department, and in Washington State was a police officer in Redmond and then a college instructor in criminal justice. She later served as Chief of Police for five years each in Ellensburg, Federal Way, and finally Spokane, from which position she retired in 2012 to become a leadership instructor for the FBI. She was also Chief Deputy of the King County Sheriff's Office for two years. In 2016 she was one of three finalists to become Superintendent of the Chicago Police Department; Mayor Rahm Emanuel subsequently appointed her Chief of the department's Bureau of Professional Standards.

Oakland, California, Chief of Police
On January 4, 2017, after six months in Chicago, Kirkpatrick was appointed by Mayor Libby Schaaf of Oakland, California, as the city's first female Chief of Police. She was sworn in on February 27, 2017.

On November 6, 2017, the chair of Oakland's privacy advisory commission, Brian Hofer, and seven others filed a complaint with Oakland's Citizens Police Review Board claiming that Police Chief Anne Kirkpatrick had made false statements about an August raid in West Oakland.

On February 20, 2020, the Oakland Police Commission voted unanimously to fire Kirkpatrick with Schaaf joining in the decision as required by the law for a police chief to be fired without cause, saying that the commission's trust in Kirkpatrick was "irrevocably broken". Kirkpatrick later revealed that she was terminated in retaliation for not performing special favors for commission members. She filed a Federal whistleblower lawsuit against the city.

References

External links
 Kirkpatrick at Oakland Wiki

Living people
21st century in Oakland, California
Chiefs of the Oakland Police Department
American women police officers
Law enforcement workers from California
People from Memphis, Tennessee
Chicago Police Department officers
University of Memphis alumni
Seattle University School of Law alumni
1959 births
21st-century American women